Rear Palace is the second position inferior from Krom Phra Ratchawang Bowon Sathan Mongkhon or the Front Palace appointed by the King occurred for the first time in the Ayutthaya period by Phra Maha Thammarachathirat He built a palace, who was located behind the Royal Grand Palace bestow as a residence of Somdej Phra Ekathotsarot, who was the youngest son and is the younger brother of Naresuan the Great, so the word Rear Palace came up. Later, during the reign of King Narai the Great Phra Traibhuvanatthidtayawong, which is a younger half-brother residing another person in the rear palace only but Phra Ekathotsarot and Phra Traibhuvanatthidtayawong no rank was added in any way.

During the reign of Somdej Phra Pethracha when he ascended to the throne, Luang Sorasak was appointed as Krom Phra Ratchawang  Boworn Sathan Mongkhon and Nai Chopkhotchaprasit was appointed as Krom Phra Ratchawang Boworn Sathan Phimuk, he received a royal command, which was considered the first person as Krom Phra Ratchawang Boworn Sathan Phimuk in the Ayutthaya period. Later, during the reign of Somdej Phra Sanphet VIII (or Phra Chao Suea) established Chao Fa Phet, the eldest son, as the Krom Phra Ratchawang Boworn Sathan Mongkol or Phra Banthoon Yai, and established Chao Fa Phon, the youngest son, as the Krom Phra Ratchawang Boworn Sathan Phimuk or Phra Banthoon Noi. Because he might be disgusted by the position  Krom Phra Ratchawang Boworn Sathan Phimuk because in the reign of Somdej Phra Pethracha he established Nai Chopkhotchaprasit as Krom Phra Ratchawang Boworn Sathan Phimuk was soon Nai Chopkhotchaprasit was executed.

List of Rear Palace lords

Ayutthaya

Rattanakosin

References 

</ref>

Thai monarchy